Woodville in an unincorporated community located in the Westfield Township of northeast Surry County, North Carolina, United States, near Big Creek .  The main thoroughfare through the community is North Carolina Highway 89 (Westfield Road).

References

Unincorporated communities in Surry County, North Carolina
Unincorporated communities in North Carolina